The National Taiwan Sport University (NTSU) is a public university specialized in sports in Taoyuan, Taiwan.

NTSU offers a variety of undergraduate and graduate programs, including bachelor's and master's degrees in fields such as sports science, physical education, leisure and recreation management, sports coaching, athletic training, and sports medicine. The university also offers doctoral programs in sports science and physical education.

History
NTSU was originally established as National College of Physical Education and Sports on 1 July 1987. On 1 February 2008, the college was renamed to National Taiwan Sport University.

Academics 
NTSU has four colleges:

Notable alumni
 Chen Kuei-ru, athlete

Transportation
The university is accessible within walking distance south of National Taiwan Sport University Station of Taoyuan Metro.

See also
 List of universities in Taiwan

References

External links

 

1987 establishments in Taiwan
Educational institutions established in 1987
Sports universities and colleges
Universities and colleges in Taoyuan City
Universities and colleges in Taiwan
Technical universities and colleges in Taiwan